Klichaw is a town in Mogilev Region, Belarus. It is located in the southwest of the region and serves as the administrative center of Klichaw District. As of 2009, its population was 7,521.

History
Klichaw is known since 1592. At the time it was a village, Klichevo, which belonged to Vitebsk Voivodeship.  In September 1772, as a result of the First Partition of Poland, the town was transferred to the Russian Empire and became a part of Minsk Governorate. On July 17, 1924 the governorate was abolished as well, and Klichaw became the administrative center of Klichaw Raion, which belonged to Bobruysk Okrug of Byelorussian Soviet Socialist Republic. On January 15, 1938 the raion was transferred to Mogilev Region. In 1938, Klichaw was granted an urban-type settlement status.

During the Second World War, the town was occupied by German troops. On October 14 1941, the Germans took all of Klichaw's Jews to the edge of the woods near Poplavy. There, they shot them. Later, however, Klichaw raion became one of the centers of the partisan activity. In March 1942, the settlement went under complete control of partisans, and later they even opened Klichaw airport for flights. In 1944, the German troops were moved west of Klichaw, and on September 20, 1944 the settlement was included into newly established Bobruysk Oblast, which was abolished in 1954. Klichaw then was returned to Mogilev Oblast. In 2000, it was granted a town status.

Economy

Industry
In Klichaw, there are enterprises of food and timber industries.

Transportation
Klichaw is connected by highways with Mogilev, Babruysk, and Berazino. The closest railway station is Neseta on the railroad connecting Mogilev and Asipovichy, several kilometers northwest of Klichaw.

Culture and recreation
In Klichaw, there is a Jewish cemetery. The Annunciation Church was built in the 1990s.

References

Towns in Belarus
Populated places in Mogilev Region
Klichaw District
Igumensky Uyezd